HNLMS Holland is the first ship of the s of the Royal Netherlands Navy.
The ship was originally designed to fulfill patrol and intervention tasks against lightly armed opponents, such as pirates and smugglers. However, it also has very advanced electronic and radar surveillance capabilities which are used for military stabilization and security roles, short of outright war. Without sonar or long range weapons, it utilizes the surveillance capabilities of the Thales integrated mast, which integrates communication systems and two 4-faced phased arrays for air and surface search.

Service history 
Holland was the first ship of the Holland-class offshore patrol vessels to enter service. The ship fulfilled its first task before it had actually entered service when on 15 March 2012 it returned a mirror that had been taken from  after the Raid on the Medway.

In 2013 Holland successfully intercepted two illegal drug transports in the Dutch Caribbean.

During the Nuclear Security Summit in 2014, Holland and  secured the coastal areas between IJmuiden and Hook of Holland.

On 10 October 2016, Holland was deployed around Haiti, to help after the impact of Hurricane Mathew.

In July 2018, the crew of HNLMS Holland ended a three-month drug patrol in the Dutch Caribbean with a visit to New York. While in the Caribbean Sea, Holland also performed coast guard duties. Hollands sister ship Friesland replaced the vessel in the Caribbean.

In August 2021, Holland was deployed to Haiti once more to support an EU Civil Protection Mechanism mission in response to the 2021 Haiti earthquake and subsequent Tropical depression, providing intelligence-gathering, safety, helicopter, and security support including an armed team.

In February 2023 the Holland was used to ferry King Willem-Alexander, Queen Maxima and Princess of Orange Catharina-Amalia from Aruba to Curaçao during a state visit to the Dutch Caribbean. During the transfer the Royal Family also went for a ride onboard one of the Hollands FRISCS.

See also 
 HNLMS Zeeland (P841)
 HNLMS Friesland (P842)
 HNLMS Groningen (P843)

References 

Holland-class offshore patrol vessels
2010 ships
Patrol vessels of the Royal Netherlands Navy
Ships built in Vlissingen